Tangletown (also Tangle Town) is an Unincorporated community in Middlesex in Washington County, Vermont, United States, in the central part of the state.

The area is loosely defined, located off Bolduc Road to the east, Alice Dobey Road and Dolan Road along the north, and Molly Supple Hill Road on the west. The placename originates from a time in the 19th century when the area was undeveloped and hunters would become confused by the tight vegetation and repeated similar topography of rock outcrops, hills, and similar vegetation, causing them to become "tangled up" (lost) in the landscape.

The area, though still sparsely settled has a named east to west road called Tangle Town Road.

References
 Rodgers, Steve. Country Towns of Vermont. McGraw-Hill: 1998. .
 Seidman, Sarah, and Patricia Wiley. Middlesex in the Making: History and Memories of a Small Vermont Town. The Middlesex Historical Society: 2006. Self-published, no ISBN.
 Swift, Esther Monroe. Vermont Place Names: Footprints of History. The Stephen Greene Press: 1996 .

Unincorporated communities in Vermont
Unincorporated communities in Washington County, Vermont